The Shupyk National Healthcare University of Ukraine (Shupyk NHU of Ukraine) is a higher education institute in Kyiv, the capital of Ukraine. Through decades, the institute has established itself as a higher educational, methodological and research centre.

Post addresse: 9, Dorogozhytska St., Kyiv, 04112, Ukraine

History 
The Kiev Institute of Advanced Training of Physicians, nowadays the Shupyk National Healthcare University of Ukraine (SNHUU), one of the first academic and research institutions of Ukraine, was founded in 1918, in the period of the Ukrainian State system, in the time of revival of Ukrainian education, science and technology.

The institute got a new qualitative status in the year of the fifth anniversary of Ukrainian independence after the Cabinet of Ministers of Ukraine had issued the Resolution “On the formation of Kiev Medical Academy of Postgraduate Education” (13 May 1996), according to which the academy was considered to be an educational institution of a new type and a higher IV level of accreditation.

In 1998, according to the Resolution of the Cabinet of Ministers of Ukraine the academy was given the name of an outstanding statesman and scientist, professor Platon L. Shupyk who twice was the Minister of Health of Ukraine. He contributed greatly to the development of the academy material, educational and scientific base.

In 2006, the academy acquired a national institution status according to a decree of the president of Ukraine.

2018 - the 100th anniversary of the Academy.

2021 - by order of the Ministry of Health of Ukraine of February 10, 2021 No.225, the Academy was renamed into Shupyk National Healthcare University of Ukraine.

Academics
Through its existence the SNHUU has become a leading institution of postgraduate medical education as well as a great research centre with 5 faculties of  surgery, therapy, pediatrics, medico-prophylactic and pharmaceutical faculty, a faculty teaching staff's advanced training and the 
Institute of Family Medicine, the Ukrainian State Institute of Reproductology, the Institute of Dentistry; there are 79 Departments.  Today, the University employs: 8 Academicians of the National Academy of Sciences of Ukraine, 3 Academicians of the Academy of Sciences of the Higher School of Ukraine, 1 Corresponding Member of the National Academy of Sciences of Ukraine and 15 Corresponding Members of the National Academy of Medical Sciences of Ukraine, 30 Honoured Workers of Science and Technology of Ukraine, 35 Winners of the State Prize of Ukraine in Science and Technology, 80 Honoured Doctors of Ukraine, 3 Honoured Workers of Education of Ukraine, 3 Honoured Rationalizers and Inventors of Ukraine, 9 Honoured Workers of Healthcare of Ukraine, 2 Honoured Workers of Pharmacy of Ukraine.

SNHUU is a leading centre of academic and methodological work in postgraduate fields which is authorized by the Ministry of Health of Ukraine to develop the majority of standard programs of the courses of precertification training, traineeship as computer attestation programs, applied by all medical institutions and faculties of postgraduate education.

70 curricula and programs of topical advanced training are developed and updated annually. Among them these are the original programs: "Digital technology in radiology", "Topical questions of quality maintenance and prevention of medicines adulteration", "Chemists' work at the market", "Untraditional methods of dental diseases treatment", "Financing and management in health care in Ukraine", "Modern technologies in interventional cardiology", "Ultrasound diagnosis of close defects of cardial septa", etc.

The Department of Medical Information Technology, in particular, is an initiator, organizer and founder of one of the progressive modern form of distance education. Since 2006 the academic and methodological centre of distance education has been working at the SNHUU.

In 2016, the Simulation Training Center was established with the aim of introducing simulation learning methods into the educational process in accordance with modern world practices in medical education to ensure maximum safety of patients and doctors during training, practicing and performing invasive medical and diagnostic procedures.

Physicians' post-graduate education is composed of internship, master's course and specialization, topical advanced training and precertification courses.

Over 20,000 physicians and pharmacists are trained at the SNHUU annually.

Scientific and research work at the university is an integral part in training highly qualified specialists and is performed in accordance with the generalized plan of scientific and research activity. The plan includes the scientific and research activity in foreground trends that have purpose investment (funding scientific and technical programs, government orders, fundamental and applied scientific and research activity in the field of preventive and clinical medicine), initiative and competitive (department) extrabudget (state contractual) dissertations (doctor's and candidate's).

The number of clinical bases of all property forms is 248.

Annually, over 14,000 surgical interventions are performed, 146,000 consultations are delivered and 93,000 patients are treated at clinical bases. SNHUU staff members implement up-dated methods of diagnosis, treatment and prophylaxis of diseases.

Within the framework of Ukrainian Emergency Medical Care Station, SNHUU staff members constantly go to regions of Ukraine to deliver consultations and medical care for patients with the most severe pathology.

Honorable doctors and famous alumni
There worked following prominent scientists as academicians, member-correspondents of the Academy of Sciences, professors as: V.H. Vasylenko, B.M. Man'kovskyi, M.M. Amosov, O.O. Shalimov, D.F. Chobotariov, F.Yu. Bohdanov, L.I. Medvid', O.M. Marzeiev, D.M. Kaliuzhnyi, O.I. Arutiunov, B.P. Komisarenko, V.D. Bratus', L.V. Tymoshenko, M.H. Shandala, E.L. Macheret, M.D. Strazhesko, M.S. Kolomiichenko, L.A. Pyrih, V.I. Koziavkin, M.M. Sergiienko and others at the university.

At different times in Ukraine the founders of new schools became scientists of the university such as M.M. Amosov, Yu.P. Vdovychenko, Yu.V. Voronenko, I.M. Hanzha, O.A. Yevdoshchenko, Ye.V. Kohanevych, E.L. Macheret, O.P. Mintser, M.Ye. Polishchyk, M.M. Sergiienko, L.V. Tymoshenko, A.I. Trishchuns'kyi, O.O. Shalimov.

Academics, member-correspondents of National Academy of Science and National Academy of Medical Science such as  Yu.V. Voronenko,  O.K. Tolstanov, Yu.I. Feshchenko, S.O. Vozianov, V.V. Kaminskyi, M.Ye. Polishyk, V.V. Kovalenko, M. D. Tronko, V.V. Lazoryshynets, O.Iu. Usenko, N.H. Horovenko, S.O. Rykov, H.V. Beketova, B.M. Mankovskyi, N.M. Rudenko, B.M. Todurov, N.V. Kharchenko, Ye.Ie. Shunko  who are well known in our country and abroad work at the university today.

International relations
The university has  the Department of International Relations and Scientific-Pedagogical Work with Foreign Subjects was organized. The major purpose of the department is to participate in developing and realizing international educational, scientific, clinical and humanitarian programs.

The relation of the university with foreign countries develops from year to year. Annually, over 30-50 foreign delegations visit the university. A number of agreements on cooperation with many countries have been signed.

Over 70 scientists visit other countries annually. Training visits are aimed at on-site training in the leading clinics, exchanging experience, establishing cooperation relations, participating in congress, symposia. Young scientists take traineeships in leading clinics of the West.

Leading scientists of Germany, Greece, Sweden, Austria, and the UK are honorous professors of the university.

The university's partners are the University of Colorado (United States), the Jagiellonian University (Poland), the Scottish Royal College of General Practitioners (United Kingdom), the German Academy of Development Rehabilitation (Munich), the University of Bari (Italy), the Medical University of Lublin (Poland), the Slovak Medical University, the Ludwig Maximilian University of Munich (Germany), the University of Maastricht (The Netherlands), the Medical University of Silesia (Poland), the International Academy of Classical Homeopathy (Greece), etc.

Great attention is paid at the university to training foreign citizens. Almost 400 foreigners from 54 countries are trained at SNHUU annually. Young scientists of the university take traineeships in leading clinics of France, Sweden, Poland, the United Kingdom, the United States, Switzerland, etc.

References

External links
 Official site of the University  
 Facebook
 Youtube
 Instagram
 Telegram

Educational institutions established in 1918
Universities in Ukraine
Universities and colleges in Kyiv
Postgraduate schools
Medical schools in Ukraine
1918 establishments in Ukraine
Institutions with the title of National in Ukraine
National universities in Ukraine